"Ligaya" (English: "Joy") is the first single by the Eraserheads from their debut album, Ultraelectromagneticpop!. The single was able to make it to the Top Ten of 97.1 WLS-FM countdown. The band last performed the song in their second and final reunion concert dubbed as "The Final Set" on March 7, 2009. No music video was made for the song.

Cover versions
Kitchie Nadal covered the song for the Eraserheads tribute album Ultraelectromagneticjam!: The Music of the Eraserheads, released in 2005.
Mayonnaise covered the song for another Eraserheads tribute album The Reunion: An Eraserheads Tribute Album, released in 2012.
Rivermaya lead vocalist from 2007-2011 Jason Fernandez covered the song as a Wishclusive on Wish 107.5 in 2018.
The song was also played in the 2018 Resorts World Manila musical Ang Huling El Bimbo.

Composition
The song is about a young man who tries to convince a girl to let him court her.

References

Eraserheads songs
1993 songs
1993 debut singles
Songs written by Ely Buendia
Tagalog-language songs